Supun Leelaratne (born 27 May 1981) is a Sri Lankan cricketer. He made his Twenty20 debut for Sri Lanka Navy Sports Club in the 2017–18 SLC Twenty20 Tournament on 25 February 2018.

References

External links
 

1981 births
Living people
Sri Lankan cricketers
Sri Lanka Navy Sports Club cricketers
Cricketers from Colombo